The Syrian Jewish Communities of the United States are a collection of communities of Syrian Jews, mostly founded at the beginning of the 20th century. The largest are in Brooklyn, Deal, New Jersey and Miami. The population of the New York and New Jersey communities is currently estimated at about 90,000.

New York
The first Syrian Jews to arrive in the United States were Jacob Dwek and Ezra Sitt, both of Aleppo. They sailed from Liverpool, England on July 22, 1892 on the Germania. After the start of the 20th century, more immigrants came to the U.S. for three reasons: First, an economic decline in Syria crippled their ability to earn a living. Second, the Young Turks, a rebel group responsible for the overthrow of the Ottoman sultan, were conscripting Jews into the Army. Third, the rise of Zionism led to increased anti-Semitism in the Middle Eastern region. Most settled on the Lower East Side of Manhattan. Later settlements were in Bensonhurst, Midwood, Flatbush, and along Ocean Parkway in Gravesend, Brooklyn. The latter is considered to be the current center of the community, though the community was formerly centered around the Magen David Synagogue on 67th street in the Bensonhurst neighborhood as listed below:

Congregation Shaare Zion, at 2030 Ocean Parkway between Avenue T and Avenue U, housing several synagogues in a single building along with a separate house as an additional annex structure. It is the largest, and is now considered the flagship synagogue of the community. The synagogue was constructed in 1960 in the Gravesend neighborhood, and the community soon followed it there throughout the rest of the 1960s and early 1970s. Until his passing on December 1, 2018, the synagogue held the seat of Chief Rabbi Saul J. Kassin II. The Rabbi's father Rabbi Jacob S. Kassin I, along with the Rabbi's brother-in-law Rabbi Baruch Ben Haim; were the previous spiritual leaders of the Syrian community in New York respectively, until their passings in 1994 and 2005. In his will, Chief Rabbi Saul J. Kassin II passed down his seat as the Chief Rabbi to his firstborn grandson, Rabbi Saul J. Kassin III (his own firstborn son, Jacob S. Kassin II, is not a rabbi). The current Chief Rabbi Saul J. Kassin III is the head rabbi of Congregation Magen David of West Deal and rosh yeshivah of Hillel Yeshiva. Another important rabbinic figure for a number of years was Rabbi Abraham Hecht. But due to conflicting political interests during the 1990s, the Rabbi was forced into submitting his resignation. Sharing in rabbinical duties are Rabbi Yaakov Ben Haim (son of Rabbi Baruch Ben Haim), Rabbi David Maslaton, Rabbi Meyer Yedid, Rabbi Raymond Haber, and Rabbi Raymond Beyda. The synagogue generally serves the Aleppo or (Halabi) Syrian community.
Congregation Magen David Synagogue, at 2017 67th Street between 20th and 21st Avenues. This synagogue was the former flagship of the community, and was erected in 1921. The synagogue was at its height of popularity during the 1940s, 1950s, and early 1960s. The synagogue is still in continual use for daily and Shabbat prayers. It is also very notable with the community at present for holding funeral services. In 2001, the building was declared a landmark by the New York City Landmarks Preservation Commission. By 2004, the building was certified and listed with the National Register of Historic Places. 

In addition to Syrian Jews proper, the community includes smaller groups of Israeli, Lebanese, Egyptian, Turkish, Moroccan and other similar origins, who have their own place within the overall "Syrian" communal structure. A distinction is also recognized between Halabis (from Aleppo) and Shamis (from Damascus). Furthermore, there is a perceived difference between the Modern Orthodox "White Hats" and those tending to Haredi Judaism "Black Hats", though this is a matter of degree rather than an absolute division.  There are no Conservative or Reform congregations affiliated with the Syrian community.

Within the community, there is also a Sephardic Community Center fulfilling functions similar to the national JCC organization. The community is characterized by multi-generational businesses; often, children are encouraged to stay within the family business. Still, many families, recognizing the challenges to financial success posed by a lack of a university degree, have been encouraging undergraduate and graduate education, especially in the fields of business and finance. Those who pursue higher education are encouraged to remain within the familial structure. A number of magazine publications, such as Image and Community Magazine, also cover social topics in relation to the community as a whole.

Synagogues
Presently, there is an array of different synagogues that cater to the community's many different backgrounds, customs and liturgical styles. They are as follows:

New Jersey

The New Jersey community is mainly based in Monmouth County, especially Deal, Elberon, Long Branch, Oakhurst and Bradley Beach. The community largely consists of people who reside there during the summer months, though some live there permanently, especially in the more inland regions of Eatontown, Oakhurst and West Deal. Hillel Yeshiva, located in Ocean Township, is a notable private school that is popular among the youth of year round residents in the Deal area.

Florida
South Florida serves as a winter retreat for many Syrian Jews from Brooklyn and the New York metropolitan area. The majority spend the winter season in the opulent gated community of Turnberry Isle and the surrounding communities, located within the City of Aventura. There they live according to the Jewish and Sephardic traditions of benefiting the community by studying Torah, prayer, and performing acts of kindness.

California

Michigan

Pennsylvania

References

External links
Sephardic and Syrian Jews in Manhattan

Sephardi synagogues
Jewish Syrian history
Jews and Judaism in the United States